3556 Lixiaohua is a dark Lixiaohua asteroid from the outer region of the asteroid belt, approximately  in diameter. It is the parent body of the Lixiaohua family. The asteroid was discovered on 30 October 1964, by astronomers at the Purple Mountain Observatory near Nanking, China. It was named after Chinese philanthropist Li Xiaohua.

Orbit and classification 

Lixiaohua is the parent body and namesake of the Lixiaohua family, a smaller asteroid family of more than 700 known members which consists of C-type and X-type asteroid. The family is located in a zone of the outer main-belt where several orbital resonance overlap. Members of this family are also prone to close encounters with other large asteroids such as with the dwarf planet Ceres. With a diameter of 35 kilometers, the family's largest member is 3330 Gantrisch, which is the reason why the Lixiaohua family is often called "Gantrisch family". It is estimated that the family is  million years old.

It orbits the Sun at a distance of 2.5–3.9 AU once every 5 years and 8 months (2,064 days). Its orbit has an eccentricity of 0.22 and an inclination of 9° with respect to the ecliptic. The body's observation arc begins with its official discovery observation at Nankin in 1964.

Naming 

This minor planet was named after Chinese philanthropist and industrialist from Beijing, who establish several schools in remote areas of China. The official naming citation was published by the Minor Planet Center on 5 January 1996.

Physical characteristics

Rotation period 

As of 2017, no rotational lightcurve of Lixiaohua has been obtained from photometric observations. The asteroid's rotation period, poles and shape remains unknown.

Diameter and albedo 

According to the survey carried out by the NEOWISE mission of NASA's Wide-field Infrared Survey Explorer, Lixiaohua measures 20.085 kilometers in diameter and its surface has a low albedo of 0.035.

References

External links 
 Lightcurve Database Query (LCDB), at www.minorplanet.info
 Dictionary of Minor Planet Names, Google books
 Asteroids and comets rotation curves, CdR – Geneva Observatory, Raoul Behrend
 Discovery Circumstances: Numbered Minor Planets (1)-(5000) – Minor Planet Center
 
 

003556
003556
Named minor planets
19641030